Moses Mather (23 February 1719 in Lyme, Connecticut21 September 1806 in Darien, Connecticut), was a Connecticut clergyman.

Biography
He graduated from Yale University in 1739, and was ordained over the Congregational church in Darien in 1744, which post he held until his death. During the American Revolutionary War, he was several times imprisoned as a patriot. Princeton University gave him the degree of D.D. in 1791.

He was noted as a controversialist. He published Infant Baptism Defended (1759), and Election Sermons (1781).

Notes

References

1719 births
1806 deaths
American Congregationalist ministers
Yale University alumni
People from Lyme, Connecticut
People of colonial Connecticut
Clergy in the American Revolution
Patriots in the American Revolution